The SSV Jahn Regensburg II is a German association football club from the city of Regensburg, Bavaria. It is the reserve team of SSV Jahn Regensburg.

The team's currently plays in the southern division of the Bayernliga, the fifth tier of the German football league system It first played in the Bayernliga in 1962–63, with the league then being the third tier of the league system.

History
The reserve team of Jahn Regensburg first rose to prominence when it played at the highest Bavarian level, then the tier three Bayernliga, for a season in 1962–63, courtesy to a title in the 2nd Amateurliga Niederbayern in 1962. The side then played under the name of SSV Jahn Regensburg Amateure and came thirteenth in the southern division of the league and was immediately relegated as the league was reduced from two to one division that season. With the decline of the senior team which was relegated from the tier two 2nd Oberliga Süd to the Bayernliga in 1963 the reserve side quickly disappeared into regional football again.

The team returned to Bayernliga level in 2002 when it took up the spot of SG Post/Süd Regensburg in the league, the later having joined Jahn that year, now playing as Jahn Regensburg II as the senior team was not a professional side anymore. The team finished in mid-table for the next four seasons in this league but was forced to step down to the Landesliga Bayern-Mitte in 2006 after the senior team itself had been relegated to the Bayernliga once more.

While the first team returned to the Regionalliga Süd immediately the following year Jahn II spend the next six seasons in the Landesliga. The last three of those the team came close to promotion on each occasion but it took until 2012 for the side to move up to the Bayernliga again. With the later league expanded once more to two divisions the team was grouped in the southern one for the first season. In 2013 the side was then transferred to the northern division where it played for three seasons until 2016 when it moved back to the south.

Honours
The club's honours:

League
 Landesliga Bayern-Mitte (IV)
 Runners-up: 2011
 2nd Amateurliga Niederbayern (IV)
 Champions: 1962

Cup
 Bavarian Cup
 Winners: 2004
 Oberpfalz Cup
 Winners: 2004

Recent seasons
The recent season-by-season performance of the club:

With the introduction of the Bezirksoberligas in 1988 as the new fifth tier, below the Landesligas, all leagues below dropped one tier. With the introduction of the Regionalligas in 1994 and the 3. Liga in 2008 as the new third tier, below the 2. Bundesliga, all leagues below dropped one tier. With the establishment of the Regionalliga Bayern as the new fourth tier in Bavaria in 2012 the Bayernliga was split into a northern and a southern division, the number of Landesligas expanded from three to five and the Bezirksoberligas abolished. All leagues from the Bezirksligas onwards were elevated one tier.

Key

References

External links
 Official website  
 Das deutsche Fußball-Archiv  historical German domestic league tables
 Manfreds Fussball Archiv  Tables and results from the Bavarian amateur leagues
 Jahn Regensburg II at Weltfussball.de 

 
Football clubs in Germany
Bavarian reserve football teams
German reserve football teams
Sport in Regensburg
Football in Upper Palatinate